Boxing has been contested at every Pan American Games since the first edition of the games in 1951. Until the 2007 Pan American Games was the final games with boxing as a male-only event. The 2011 Pan American Games included women's boxing in the program for the first time.

Medal table
The following table is ranked by the number of golds, then silvers, then bronzes. At the 1951 games there the losing semi-finalists held a bronze medal playoff; since then, both losing semi-finalists have received bronze medals.

''Updated to include 2019 results (including women results).

See also
 Pan American Boxing Championships (discontinued event)

References   

 
Sports at the Pan American Games
Pan American Games
Pan American Games
Pan American Games